The 2016 Best Footballer in Asia, given to the best football player in Asia as judged by a panel of 38 sports journalists, was awarded to Shinji Okazaki on 26 December 2016.

Voting
The prize witnessed the first significant enlargement of the panel of jurors since its birth. There were 38 jurors in the panel. 33 jurors were from different AFC nations/regions including Afghanistan, Australia, Bahrain, Cambodia, China, Chinese Taipei, Hong Kong, India, Indonesia, Iran, Iraq, Japan, Jordan, Korea Republic, Kuwait, Lebanon, Macao, Malaysia, Myanmar, Oman, Pakistan, Palestine, Philippines, Qatar, Saudi Arabia, Singapore, Syria, Tajikistan, Thailand, Turkmenistan, United Arabic Emirates, Uzbekistan and Vietnam. Five jurors were invited from non-AFC media outlets.

Rules
Each juror selects 5 best footballers and awards them 5, 4, 3, 2 points and 1 point respectively from their first choice to the fifth choice. The trophy of the Best Footballer in Asia is awarded to the player with the highest total of points.

Tiebreakers
When two or more candidates obtain the same points, the rankings of the concerned candidates would be based upon the following criteria in order.

a) The number of the 1st-place vote obtained

b) The number of the 2nd-place vote obtained

c) The number of the 3rd-place vote obtained

d) The number of the 4th-place vote obtained

If all conditions are equal, the concerned candidates will be tied in rankings.

Ranking

References

2016
2016 awards
2016 in Asian football